Polinices uberinus, common name the "white moon snail" or "dwarf white moon snail", is a species of small predatory sea snail, a marine gastropod mollusk in the family Naticidae, the moon snails.

Distribution

Description 
The maximum recorded shell length is 20 mm.

Habitat 
The minimum recorded depth for this species is 27 m; the maximum recorded depth is 183 m.

References

External links
 Image of three shells from off of St. Augustine, Florida here

Naticidae
Gastropods described in 1842